Anthony "Tony" McGuinness (born 1 January 1961) is an English-born Irish musician bassist formerly of the Irish rock band Aslan.

Career
He originally started his music career as a drummer in the late 1970s and early 1980s, but switched to bass guitar soon after being influenced by watching his cousin Steve Garvey on bass guitar for UK punk outfit The Buzzcocks. He is one of the co-founders of Aslan, and wrote many of their most popular songs including "She's So Beautiful", "Comfort Me", "Jealous Little Thing", "Sooner Or Later" and "Here Comes The Sun". He also produced some of the band's b-sides.

He is highly regarded by fellow musicians and critics as an outstanding bass player/acoustic & songwriter, with an unorthodox and unique playing style which ultimately gave Aslan's music that distinctive sound.

McGuinness has also worked with Sinéad O'Connor and co-wrote with The Script.

In February 2008, McGuinness announced that he was to move to Australia with his wife Margaret, and daughter Georgia, and would be replaced by Rodney O'Brien as bass player for Aslan.

He moved back to Ireland in 2017.

References

External links
Aslan website
Tony McGuinness official website

Irish bass guitarists
Irish male guitarists
English bass guitarists
English male guitarists
Male bass guitarists
Living people
1961 births